Ticao Island is an island with a total land area of . It is one of the three major islands of Masbate province in the Philippines. It is separated from the Bicol Peninsula by the Ticao Pass. The other two major islands are Masbate Island and Burias Island.

The island is divided into the municipalities of Batuan, Monreal, San Fernando and its mother-town, San Jacinto.

San Miguel Island is located "just off the northern tip" of Ticao Island.

Archaeological and Ecological Landscape and Seascape of Ticao

Ticao island is known as an archaeological landscape, possessing thousands of pre-colonial artifacts such as the Baybayin-inscribed Rizal Stone, Ticao gold spike teeth, Burial jars of varying designs and sizes, jade beads, human face rock statues, and the Ticao petrographs. Much of the homes in Ticao island use these archaeological finds to design their interiors. The island is also an ecological frontier for the conservation of manta rays. The island also possesses a 'rare subspecies' of Visayan warty pig, that is almost near extinction. Penelopides panini ticaensis, or the Ticao hornbill, was a subspecies of the Visayan hornbill (Penelopides panini) known to occur only in Ticao Island. It is likely extinct in the island due to deforestation and habitat conversion.

References

Islands of Masbate